The Vishnu temples at Nangur are a group of 11 temples near Nangur in Mayiladuthurai district of Tamil Nadu, India. The eleven temples are part of the 108 Divya Desams of the Hindu god Vishnu. 

The temples at Nangur are believed to have been sanctified by Tirumangai Alvar, one of the 12 Alvars. The oldest of them have been dated to the reign of the Medieval Chola king Parantaka I.

Festival
The Thirumangai Alvar Mangalasasana utsavam (festival) in the month of Thai (Jan-Feb) on the New Moon day (Amavasai) witnesses 11 Garuda sevai a spectacular event in which festival images idols from the 11 Thirunaangur Divya Desam shrines in the area are brought on Garuda mounts to Thirunangur. 

An idol of Thirumangai Alvar is also brought here on a Hamsa Vahanam (palanquin) and his pasurams (verses) dedicated to each of these 11 temples are recited. The Utsavar (festival deity) of Thirumangai Alvar and his consort Sri Kumudavalli Naachiyar are taken in a palanquin to each of the 11 temples, through the paddy fields in the area.  

The pasurams (poems) dedicated to each of the 11 Divya Desams are chanted in the respective shrines. This is the most important of the festivals in this area, and it draws thousands of visitors.

Thirunangur Tirupathis

References

External links

 
Vishnu temples in Mayiladuthurai district